Dangar Island is a forested island,  in area, in the Hawkesbury River, just north of Sydney, New South Wales, Australia. Dangar Island is a suburb of Hornsby Shire and as at the 2016 census had a population of 303, which swells dramatically during holiday seasons. The island is serviced regularly by Brooklyn Ferry Service and departs from Brooklyn and takes about fifteen minutes. The Brooklyn ferry is itself adjacent to Hawkesbury River railway station. The ferry service is in operation 7 days a week.

History 
Dangar Island has been known to the local Guringai Aborigines for thousands of years. The first European to visit the area was Governor Arthur Phillip, who explored the lower river by small boat in March 1788 within weeks of the First Fleet's arrival. He named it Mullet Island, for the abundance of fish in the local Hawksbury River. At first the local people were friendly towards him, but when he returned a year later, they would not come into contact. By 1790, over half the Guringai people had succumbed to the smallpox the British had brought with them.

The island was purchased in 1864 and renamed by Henry Cary Dangar, the son of Henry Dangar, a surveyor, pastoralist and parliamentarian.

Dangar leased the island to the Union Bridge Company of Chicago for the construction of the original Hawkesbury River Rail Bridge between 1886 and 1889. About 300 workers and their families lived there and the island boasted a large social hall, school, library and its own newspaper.

In the 1920s the island, which is barely a five-minute walk across, was divided into residential plots, though space was reserved on the beach, the flat and the top of the hill for recreational use.
Dangar Island Post Office opened on 1 September 1951 and closed in 1986.

Population 
In the 2016 Census, there were 303 people in Dangar Island. 61.2% of people were born in Australia and 85.4% of people spoke only English at home. The most common response for religion was No Religion at 49.2%.

About the island 

In contrast to much of the surrounding area, which is designated national park, Dangar Island is relatively heavily inhabited. This was not always so. The island has several tarmacked roads which are closed off to all but the community fire truck, the council ute and vehicles with special permits. There are no private cars on the island. A wheelbarrow is a common method used to haul goods from the ferry. The island has one shop/café, and a bowling club for members/visitors which has a bar. The island also has a community hall that supports several community groups, including a children's film workshop, and mains water.

The island was connected to the water supply system by the then Metropolitan Water Sewerage and Drainage Board in 1971. The island has since been connected to the Sydney sewerage system by Sydney Water, via a sub-marine pipeline to the mainland and a state-of-the-art treatment plant in Brooklyn. Septic tanks are being quickly phased out by most residents, providing a boost to the Hawkesbury waterways surrounding Dangar Island. Mail is delivered to the island daily by Australia's last Riverboat Postman.

The island has a shop next to the ferry wharf that serves light snacks, coffee, breakfast and lunch. It also sells groceries and has a good supply of meat. On the weekend the Dangar Island Bowling Club, which is licensed, serves meals and you can play bowls.

Island access 

Travelling by road from the south, from either Sydney or Hornsby, access is available by the M1 motorway. Drive across the Hawkesbury River Bridge at Kangaroo Point and follow the Brooklyn-Mooney Mooney turnoff just after you cross the river. Travelling by road from the north, from either Newcastle or Gosford, access is available via the M1 motorway. As you approach the Hawkesbury River you can exit the motorway via the Brooklyn-Mooney Mooney turnoff on your left hand side. Follow the signs to Brooklyn and drive through the village. At the end of the road you will find a public car park and the Dangar Island Ferry Wharf.

Rail travellers can catch any all-stations train on the Central Coast & Newcastle line. If travelling from Central (Sydney), the train departs from the InterCity section (Platforms 1–15). Alight at Hawkesbury River Railway Station (after Cowan railway station). Access to and from
the station platforms is possible by lifts. The Dangar Island ferry can be seen on your left as you leave the station.

See also 
 Scotland Island
 Little Wobby
 Ann Howard (author)

References

Further reading

Suburbs of Sydney
Islands of New South Wales
Ferries of New South Wales
Hawkesbury River
River islands of Australia
Hornsby Shire